“International Years of Science” has been hosted by the German Federal Ministry of Education and Research (BMBF) every year since 2007 in collaboration with a strategically important partner country in order to enhance Germany's visibility as an attractive country for international collaboration in education, research, and innovation. The event promotes university association, research and development projects, and support for vocational education and training.

Objectives and Priorities 
In order to achieve the goals of the International Science Years, the German BMBF and the corresponding ministry in the partner country invite research institutions and educational establishments to present their joint projects to the public, to strengthen exchange between young research talent and to launch new collaborations. Examples of activities which are eligible for funding include delegation visits, events, workshops, as well as ‘best practice’ projects which promote cooperation in education and research and in science and technology.

The key activities of the International Years of Science reflect the research agendas of the respective countries (the "High-Tech Strategy" in the case of Germany) and bilateral agreements on scientific and technological cooperation (STC Agreements). As the previous International Years of Science demonstrate, more and more attention is being given to global challenges of the future like climate and energy, health and nutrition, mobility, security and communication as well as the task of supporting innovation. This has resulted in ever closer interaction between policy-makers, science and industry.

The goals and activities of the International Science Years are publicized on their own dedicated websites aimed at experts and the general public, which include background information and project descriptions as well as calendars of events. The Years of Science are backed up by a wide-ranging publicity campaign sponsored by the BMBF.

The International Bureau of the BMBF at the German Aerospace Center (DLR) supports the BMBF in the coordination and communications activities of the International Years of Science.

Previous german International Years of Science 
 The German-Egyptian Year of Science and Technology 2007
 The German-Israeli Year of Science and Technology 2008
 German-Chinese Year of Science and Education 2009/10
 German-Brazilian Year of Science, Technology and Innovation 2010/11
 German-Russian Year of Education, Science and Innovation 2011/12
 German-South African Year of Science 2012/2013

The German-Egyptian Year of Science and Technology 2007 
The motto of the German-Egyptian Year of Science and Technology was 'Linking Scientific Masterminds'. It was jointly launched by the Research Ministers of both countries on 15 January 2007 in Cairo. Its aim was to bring together scientists, initiate joint research projects and launch bilateral research projects that would strengthen scientific cooperation well beyond 2007. Six research networks in the fields of materials sciences, water, renewable energy, biotechnology, health research and the arts and social sciences represented the core fields of the Year of Science. The application focus and industrial relevance of the bilateral projects in particular were strengthened. In addition, the involvement of new university and non-university partners in Egypt provided a broader basis for cooperation. Examples include the implementation of a German-Egyptian Research Fund (GERF) or the German University of Cairo (GUC). The German-Egyptian Year of Science and Technology and the more than 150 associated events were well received by scientists and scholars as well as the general public. These events included the opening ceremony in Cairo, the multimedia show "Culturama" in Berlin, the open day on the research vessel METEOR in Port Said, the centennial celebration of the German Archaeological Institute in Cairo, the exhibition “Egypt’s Sunken Treasures” in Bonn, and the exhibition of mummies and an accompanying academic programme at the Landesmuseum in Stuttgart. As a gateway to the Arab world, Egypt remains one of Germany's most important partner countries in the Middle East. The German University in Cairo opened a campus in Berlin in January 2013.

The German-Israeli Year of Science and Technology 2008 
The aim of the German-Israeli Year of Science and Technology, which kicked off in Berlin on 8 April 2008, was to highlight the diversity and excellence of bilateral cooperation in science and to raise awareness in Israel about Germany as a key location for research. Special emphasis was given to cooperation between young scientists from both countries. The Year of Science provided new impetus, for example by focusing on application-oriented R&D collaborations and also by strengthening the humanities and social sciences. The establishment of the Minerva Humanities Center was a milestone in this process. Further key areas of the Year of Science and Technology were the medical sciences, security research and environmental research. In order to improve the prospects of young scientists and scholars and give them special support in the context of German-Israeli cooperation, the BMBF introduced the Award for Research Cooperation and Highest Excellence (ARCHES) for young researchers, which is now conferred on an annual basis. The application and selection procedure is administered by the Minerva Foundation. A major focus of the German-Israeli intergovernmental consultations held in 2012 was on the successful cooperation in cancer research and the start of collaboration in battery research and electrochemistry.

German-Chinese Year of Science and Education 2009/10 
The slogan "Together on the road to knowledge" was the motto of the German-Chinese Year of Science and Education 2009/10, which took place from March 2009 to June 2010. German and Chinese players in science, education, politics and society came together at more than 200 events, workshops and delegation visits, which included the Lindau Nobel Laureate Meeting with young Chinese research talent in attendance, and the BMBF's participation in events jointly organized by Germany and China in Shenyang and Wuhan on the topic of "sustainable urban development" during the campaign “Germany and China – Moving Ahead Together" (DuC), which attracted more than 300,000 visitors each. In addition, students and scientists gathered information on further activities of the Science Year, about German education and research institutions and research funding opportunities. In Germany the first ever “China Weeks” were held at 47 German universities to provide information about the partner country to the public and to draw attention to the potential of German-Chinese cooperation in higher education and research. A film contest was also launched during the Science Year. The BMBF provided funding worth some two million euros to German research projects with a focus on China. Key areas of the cooperation included cutting-edge research on climate, energy and health issues, as well as activities in the areas of vocational training and higher education. The first and second German-Chinese intergovernmental consultations (2011: Berlin; 2012: Beijing) raised cooperation between the two countries to a new level. In total, seven joint declarations on education and research topics were signed during the intergovernmental consultations. The range of topics in the cooperation between the BMBF and China in the higher education sector (students, graduate students, scientist exchanges, universities) and in vocational education and training was addressed in joint activities in various research disciplines such as innovation research, life sciences, environment/ecology, LED technologies, geosciences, marine research or cultural heritage.

German-Brazilian Year of Science, Technology and Innovation 2010/11 
A large number of events in the field of science, research and education were held in Germany and Brazil from April 2010 to April 2011. The slogan "sustainable:innovative" guided Brazilian and German universities, research institutions, scientists and students as they came together to exchange information on a wide variety of issues related to sustainability and innovation and to launch new bilateral projects. The aim of these activities was to raise awareness of the diversity and excellence of German-Brazilian bilateral science cooperation and to give fresh impetus to scientific and technological cooperation. More than 100 events took place, including 60 'best practice' projects which received more than 1 million euros in funding from the BMBF. Highlights of the Science Year included the Brazil Week at Münster University, a road show in Brazil which showcased Germany as a location for research, the "Eye of the Sky" touring exhibition of the German Aerospace Center (DLR) and a promotional tour through Brazil to attract students to come to study in Germany. The German-Brazilian Year launched the foundation of an agricultural research laboratory at the Brazilian Agricultural Research Corporation (EMBRAPA) under the umbrella of the Helmholtz Research Centre Jülich. Since 2012 the two institutions have been working in close cooperation in the field of plant breeding. A workshop on the topic "Creating Value from Bio-Resources", also held during the Science Year, marked the start of greater cooperation in this field of research. The cooperation is meant to help both countries in the development towards a bio-based economy.

German-Russian Year of Education, Science and Innovation 2011/12 
The German-Russian Year's slogan "Partnership of Ideas" was the motto of more than 200 events held between May 2011 and May 2012. Priority areas included basic research in the field of physics, optical technologies, marine and polar research, information and communication technologies, biological research and biotechnology. A German-Russian collaboration in the area of vocational education and training (VET) led to the establishment of bilateral VET partnerships, and thanks to joint innovation partnerships research results were translated more efficiently into ready-for-market products. Special emphasis was given to the support of young talent: the qualifications of young scientists in both countries were enhanced through German-Russian exchange programmes and partnerships between institutions of higher education. Eighteen select German universities hosted "Russia Weeks" to raise awareness among students, scientists and the general public of the potential of German-Russian cooperation in the higher education sector. German and Russian scientific organizations, research institutions and universities and the ministries of both countries dedicated themselves to further strengthening ties in the areas of education, research and innovation and affirmed their intentions in a number of written agreements.

The Russia country campaign, which runs from 2012 to 2014 as part of the "Promoting Innovation in Germany" initiative under the umbrella of "Research in Germany", is a continuation of the German-Russian Year of Education, Science and Innovation 2011/2012. Its objective is to further strengthen bilateral cooperation between research and science organizations. The country campaign also supports the marketing projects of German research institutes and innovative businesses. The focus areas of the country campaign are optical technologies, nanotechnology, resource efficiency and health. At the German-Russian intergovernmental consultations in April 2013 both countries emphasized their close cooperation in polar and marine research. Research in this field focuses on the shrinking of the Arctic ice cap and on the reconstruction of the history of the climate over the past 3.6 million years.

German-South African Year of Science 2012/2013 
The German-South African Year of Science brought together scientists from both countries under the slogan "Enhancing Science Partnerships for Innovation and Sustainable Development" to focus on seven thematic fields: climate change, bioeconomy, urbanization, health innovation, astronomy, social sciences & humanities, and human capital development. One of the most important focus areas of German-South African research activity during the Year of Science was and still is research on climate change, its causes and effects. Projects and workshops on the topic were organized which focussed on closed ecosystems, biodiversity, management of water resources or changes in soils. A total of 200 events took place during the year, including the first joint German-South African expedition to Antarctica on the research vessel Polarstern. The ministries of the two countries sponsored 41 projects in the framework of an ideas competition; contests at schools, summer schools, lecture series and specialist conferences were also held. The establishment of a joint research chair was agreed at the end of the Science Year which will be devoted to one of the seven thematic fields and located at one of South Africa's top universities. Furthermore, the Alexander von Humboldt Foundation launched the ‘Neville Alexander Memorial Fund’ with support from the German Federal Ministry of Education and Research (BMBF).

References

External links

Homepage of the Federal Ministry of Education and Research
Strategy of the Federal Government for the Internationalization of Science and Research (in German)
Overview of the International Science Years on the website of the Federal Ministry of Education and Research
The German-Egyptian Year of Science and Technology 2007
Research in Germany

Sources 
The German-Egyptian Year of Science and Technology 2007
 BMBF Press Release 003/2007 on the opening of the Year of Science (in German) 
 BMBF Press Release 047/2007 on the opening of the "Culturama" multimedia show and other events of the Year of Science (in German)
 BMBF Press Release 245/2007 on the joint research fund (in German) 
 BMBF Press Release of 25 September 2008 on events and priorities in the Year of Science 
 BMBF Press Release of 29 January 2013: "Egypt - Supporting Democratization" on key areas/highlights of bilateral cooperation in the Year of Science

The German-Israeli Year of Science and Technology 2008
 Official  newsletter of activities in the German-Israeli Year of Science and Technology 2008 
 BMBF Press Release of 8 April 2008: Opening of the German-Israeli Year of Science and Technology
 Overview of press releases issued by BMBF during the Year of Science
 BMBF Press Release of 6 December 2012: "Built on Trust: German-Israeli Cooperation in Science and Research" on priorities of cooperation
 " BMBF publication "Germany - Israel: Science and Technology, Education and Research" (PDF; 3,6 MB)"

German-Chinese Year of Science and Education 2009/10
  Newsletter on German-Chinese Year of Science
 Interim report on German-Chinese Year of Science (PDF; 2,3 MB)
 Brochure for the conclusion of the German-Chinese Year of Science (PDF; 8,7 MB)
  BMBF Press Releases on German-Chinese Year
 BMBF Press Release of 1 October 2012: "China - Intensive Research Cooperation in New Fields"

German-Brazilian Year of Science, Technology and Innovation 2010/11
 Brochure for the conclusion of the German-Brazilian Year of Science (in German) (PDF; 2,8 MB)
 BMBF Press Release 285/2009 on the kick-off (in German) 
 BMBF Press Release 052/2009: "Germany and Brazil build large climate measurement tower along the Amazon" (in German)
 BMBF Press Release 046/2011: "Potsdam and Rio explore magnetic fields and solar winds" (in German)
 BMBF Press Release 008/2012: "Germany and Brazil step up cooperation in agricultural research" (in German)
 BMBF Press Release of 22 February 2013: "Brazil"

German-Russian Year of Education, Science and Innovation 2011/12
 ITB infoservice: Russia - Modernization through innovation and research
 Brochure for the conclusion of the German-Russian Year of Science (in German)
 List of projects funded in the Science Year (in German)
 BMBF Press Release of 10 April 2013: "Closer Cooperation with the Russian Federation" (in German)

German-South African Year of Science 2012/2013
 Brochure for the conclusion of the Year of Science (German-South African Cooperation on Science, Technology and Innovation for Sustainable Development)
 Press releases issued during the Year of Science
 Media library of the Year of Science
 List of projects funded in the Science Year
 BMBF Press Release of 16 April 2013: "Sharing Global Responsibility: German-South African Year of Science"

Science and technology in Germany
Science events
Observances about science